South Colchester Academy (SCA) is a secondary school located in Brookfield, Nova Scotia, Canada. The Academy serves approximately 500 students in grades 7 - 12. SCA opened in 2003, and has a number of features such as a 'cafetorium' that functions both as a cafeteria and an auditorium. The school is equipped in information technology resources, a double gymnasium, a fitness room, library, 2 fully equipped computer labs, an outdoor amphitheatre, track, 2 soccer fields, basketball courts & numerous other amenities. SCA also has a band program for junior high students.

External links
 Official Site

High schools in Nova Scotia
Schools in Colchester County